Mig, MiG, or MIG may refer to:

Business
MiG, a Russian aircraft corporation
Any of the MiG aircraft
Marfin Investment Group, Greek private equity company 
Atlas Arteria, formerly Macquarie Infrastructure Group, toll roads company 
Mortgage indemnity guarantee

Other uses
 Mig33 mobile social networking, Australian digital media company 
 Luton Town MIGs, English football hooligans
 Monokine Induced by Gamma interferon, or CXCL9
 IATA code for Mianyang Nanjiao Airport, China
 Mig Ayesa, an Australian singer-songwriter
 MiG (album), a 2007 album by Mig Ayesa
 Metal inert gas welding or MIG welding
 Metal-insulator-graphene, a novel type of diodes